Vennis C. Manning (born December 23, 1947) is an American educator and politician. A member of the Democratic Party, he served in the Mississippi State Senate from 1984 to 1988 and the Mississippi House of Representatives from 1996 to 2000.

References

Democratic Party members of the Mississippi House of Representatives
1947 births
Living people
20th-century American politicians
21st-century American politicians